
Year 65 BC was a year of the pre-Julian Roman calendar. At the time it was known as the Year of the Consulship of Cotta and Torquatus (or, less frequently, year 689 Ab urbe condita). The denomination 65 BC for this year has been used since the early medieval period, when the Anno Domini calendar era became the prevalent method in Europe for naming years.

Events 
 By place 

 Roman Republic 
 In response to the illegal exercise of citizen rights by foreigners, the Roman Senate passes the Lex Papia, which expels all foreigners from Rome
 Tigranes of Armenia is defeated and captured by Pompey, thus ending all hostilities on the northeastern frontier of Rome.
 Pompey the Great subjugates the kingdom of Iberia and makes Colchis a Roman province.

 Western Han Empire 
9th year of the reign of Emperor Xuan of Han

Births 
 December 8 – Horace, Roman poet (d. 8 BC)
 Gaius Asinius Pollio, Roman orator, poet and historian (d. AD 4)

Deaths 
 Xiphares, son of Mithridates VI (b. c. 85 BC)

References